Mel Plaut is a writer from New York City who was recognized by ABC News and the Associated Press in January 2006. 

Plaut ran a blog called "New York Hack" about her career as a New York City taxi driver. In 2007, her book Hack: How I Stopped Worrying About What to Do with My Life and Started Driving a Yellow Cab was published by Villard. At the time of publication, women made up only about 200 of the 40,000 cab drivers in NYC. 

Plaut has written for The New York Times, The Huffington Post, and has had essays air on NPR's All Things Considered and Weekend America. She was educated at the University at Buffalo, the University of East Anglia, the University of New Mexico (BA, 1997) and City University of New York-Hunter College (MUP).

In 2016, Plaut was featured in the HBO documentary Suited. In 2019, Plaut published an essay in HuffPost about moving to rural Georgia and discovering Southern queer gun groups.

References

External links
New York Hack

 

Year of birth missing (living people)
Living people
University of New Mexico alumni
American bloggers
21st-century American women writers
American women non-fiction writers
21st-century American non-fiction writers
American women bloggers
University at Buffalo alumni